The U.S. state of Maryland offers a large number of non-passenger and special vehicle registration plates. Each type uses a two-, three-, or four-letter prefix (for cars, multi-purpose vehicles, and light trucks) or suffix (for motorcycles). Organizational plates may be displayed on passenger cars, multi-purpose vehicles, and trucks weighing 10,000 pounds and less, and some types are also available for use on motorcycles. On plates displaying a logo at left, the prefix or suffix is displayed vertically, while on plates that do not display a logo, the prefix is displayed horizontally. Logo plates have a $25 one time fee, while non-logo plates have a $15 one time fee, unless the plate is issued to a vehicle belonging to a member of a volunteer fire department or a Disabled American Veteran.

A

B

C

D

G

M

N

P

S

References

Transportation in Maryland
Maryland transportation-related lists
Maryland Non-passenger